Guy Smith (born 8 March 1996) is a Dutch footballer who played for ADO Den Haag, as a midfielder. Currently, he plays for VV Noordwijk in the Hoofdklasse B.

Career 
Playing at Voorschoten '97, Smith joined ADO Den Haag's youth side. He made his first team debut on 24 October 2015 against FC Dordrecht (2−0 win). He started on the bench and came in after 89 minutes as a substitute for Mathias Gehrt. In June 2015 he joined VV Noordwijk. He made his official debut for the club on 2 September 2015 in the 2−1 KNVB District Cup win over HFC EDO. His league debut followed on 12 December 2015 in the game against FC Rijnvogels.

Career statistics

References

1996 births
Living people
Dutch footballers
ADO Den Haag players
Eredivisie players
Association football midfielders
People from Leidschendam
Voorschoten '97 players
VV Noordwijk players
Footballers from South Holland